The following teams took part in the Division II tournament. Group A played in Debrecen, Hungary, between December 13 and December 19, 2009. Group B played in Narva, Estonia between December 12 and December 18, 2009:

Group A 

Group B 

See also 
 2010 World Junior Ice Hockey Championships
 2010 World Junior Ice Hockey Championships – Division I
 2010 World Junior Ice Hockey Championships – Division III
 2010 World Junior Ice Hockey Championships rosters

Junior World Championships – Division II
II
World Junior Ice Hockey Championships – Division II
International ice hockey competitions hosted by Estonia
International ice hockey competitions hosted by Hungary
IIHF
IIHF